Streptomyces poonensis is a bacterium species from the genus of Streptomyces. Streptomyces poonensis can degrade 4-hydroxybenzoate.

See also 
 List of Streptomyces species

References

Further reading

External links
Type strain of Streptomyces poonensis at BacDive -  the Bacterial Diversity Metadatabase	

poonensis
Bacteria described in 1970